The rushma is one of the most commonly recited prayers in Mandaeism. It is a "signing" prayer recited during daily ablutions (rishama). The same word can also be used to refer to the ritual signing gesture associated with the prayer.

The rushma is numbered as Prayer 104 in E. S. Drower's version of the Qolasta, which was based on manuscript 53 of the Drower Collection (abbreviated DC 53). In Drower's ordering, the Asiet Malkia prayer (CP 105) follows the rushma prayer, while the ʿniana ("response") prayers come before the rushma.

Signing
Rushma literally means "sign" or "signing" (ritual gesture). Many lines in the prayer are repeated three times as the reciter signs the rushma front of the face with his or her fingers.

See also
Brakha (daily prayer in Mandaeism)
Rahma (Mandaeism)
Qolasta
Rishama (ablution)
Tamasha (ablution)
Wudu

Signing
Sign of the cross
Kushta
Mudra

References

Mandaic words and phrases
Mandaean prayer
Hand gestures
Mandaean rituals